The 2020 Armed Forces Bowl was a college football bowl game played on December 31, 2020, with kickoff at noon EST (11:00 a.m. local CST). It was the 18th edition of the Armed Forces Bowl, and was one of the 2020–21 bowl games concluding the 2020 FBS football season. Sponsored by aerospace and defense company Lockheed Martin, the game was officially known as the Lockheed Martin Armed Forces Bowl.

Teams
Following the cancellation of the Las Vegas Bowl, it had been announced that the game would feature its tie-ins with the Pac-12 Conference and the Southeastern Conference (SEC). The presence of a Pac-12 team did not come to fruition, with the Tulsa Golden Hurricane of the American Athletic Conference ("The American") accepting a bid for the Armed Forces Bowl instead.  This game was the first matchup between the two programs.

Mississippi State

Mississippi State of the SEC accepted their bid on December 20, 2020. The Bulldogs entered the bowl with an overall record of 3–7; they were ranked at number 16 in the AP Poll early in the season after defeating the defending national champions, LSU. This marked the second time in program history that Mississippi State had entered a bowl game with a losing record (the prior instance being the 2016 St. Petersburg Bowl). This was the Bulldogs' first appearance in the bowl.

Tulsa

Tulsa of The American accepted their bid on December 20, 2020. The Golden Hurricane entered the bowl with an overall record of 6–2 (6–0 in conference play); they were ranked at number 22 in the AP Poll entering the bowl. Tulsa was 0–2 in prior editions of the bowl, having lost in 2006 and 2011.

Game summary

Statistics

Emmanuel Forbes of Mississippi State set a new Armed Forces Bowl record for the longest interception return, 90 yards.

Post-game
Immediately following the conclusion of the game, a "massive" brawl broke out between the two teams. Several players started punching and kicking each other before eventually being broken up. Neither head coach was sure of what started the incident.

References

External links

Game statistics at statbroadcast.com

Armed Forces Bowl
Armed Forces Bowl
Brawls in team sports
Armed Forces Bowl
Armed Forces Bowl
Mississippi State Bulldogs football bowl games
Tulsa Golden Hurricane football bowl games